Yohan Cassubie (born 18 October 2000) is a French professional footballer who plays as a midfielder for Niort.

Club career
On 23 July 2021, Cassubie signed his first professional contract with Niort for 2 years. He made his senior debut with Niort in a 0–0 Ligue 2 tie with Valenciennes FC on 24 July 2021.

References

External links
 

2000 births
Living people
People from Gonesse
French footballers
Association football midfielders
Chamois Niortais F.C. players
Ligue 2 players
Championnat National 3 players
Footballers from Val-d'Oise